Thomas Aasen Markeng (born 18 June 2000) is a Norwegian ski jumper.

At the 2018 Junior World Championships he won a bronze medal in the team competition, and at the 2019 Junior World Championships he won the gold medal in the normal hill as well as a team silver medal. He made his Continental Cup debut on the summer circuit in August 2017 in Szczyrk, recording his first podiums in February 2019 in Iron Mountain, Michigan with a victory and a third place.

He made his FIS Ski Jumping World Cup debut in February 2019 in Willingen, where he also collected his first World Cup points with a 27th-place finish. The same month he received a berth on the Norwegian World Championships team.

He represents the sports club Lensbygda SK.

References 

2000 births
Living people
People from Østre Toten
Norwegian male ski jumpers
Sportspeople from Innlandet
21st-century Norwegian people